Pyrimidine dimers are molecular lesions formed from thymine or cytosine bases in DNA via photochemical reactions, commonly associated with direct DNA damage. Ultraviolet light (UV; particularly UVB) induces the formation of covalent linkages between consecutive bases along the nucleotide chain in the vicinity of their carbon–carbon double bonds. The dimerization reaction can also occur among pyrimidine bases in dsRNA (double-stranded RNA)—uracil or cytosine. Two common UV products are cyclobutane pyrimidine dimers (CPDs) and 6–4 photoproducts. These premutagenic lesions alter the structure and possibly the base-pairing. Up to 50–100 such reactions per second might occur in a skin cell during exposure to sunlight, but are usually corrected within seconds by photolyase reactivation or nucleotide excision repair. Uncorrected lesions can inhibit polymerases, cause misreading during transcription or replication, or lead to arrest of replication. It causes sunburn and it triggers the production of melanin. Pyrimidine dimers are the primary cause of melanomas in humans.

Types of dimers

A cyclobutane pyrimidine dimer (CPD) contains a four membered ring arising from the coupling of the two double-bonded carbons of each of the pyrimidines. Such dimers interfere with base pairing during DNA replication, leading to mutations.

A 6–4 photoproduct (6–4 pyrimidine–pyrimidone or 6–4 pyrimidine–pyrimidinone) is an alternate dimer consisting of a single covalent bond between the carbon at the 6 position of one ring and carbon at the 4 position of the ring on the next base. This type of conversion occurs at one third the frequency of CPDs but is more mutagenic.

A third type of lesion is a Dewar pyrimidinone, formed by a reversible isomerization of the 6–4 photoproduct upon further exposure to light.

Skin light exposure
Due to the excellent photochemical properties of DNA, this nature-made molecule is damaged by only a tiny fraction of the absorbed photons. DNA transforms more than 99.9% of the photons into harmless heat (but the damage from the remaining < 0.1% is still enough to cause sunburn). The transformation of excitation energy into harmless heat occurs via a photochemical process called internal conversion. In DNA, this internal conversion is extremely fast, and therefore efficient. This ultrafast (subpicosecond) internal conversion is a powerful photoprotection provided by single nucleotides. However, the Ground-State Recovery is much slower (picoseconds) in G·C−DNA duplexes and hairpins. It is presumed to be even slower for double-stranded DNA in conditions of the nucleus.
The absorption spectrum of DNA shows a strong absorption for UVB radiation and a much lower absorption for UVA radiation. Since the action spectrum of sunburn is indistinguishable from the absorption spectrum of DNA, it is generally accepted that the direct DNA damages are the cause of sunburn. 
While the human body reacts to direct DNA damages with a painful warning signal, no such warning signal is generated from indirect DNA damage.

Mutagenesis
Translesion polymerases frequently introduce mutations at pyrimidine dimers, both in prokaryotes (SOS mutagenesis) and in eukaryotes. Although the thymine-thymine CPDs (thymine dimers) are the most frequent lesions caused by UV light, translesion polymerases are biased toward introduction of As, so that TT dimers are often replicated correctly. On the other hand, any C involved in CPDs is prone to be deaminated, inducing a C to T transition.

DNA repair

Pyrimidine dimers introduce local conformational changes in the DNA structure, which allow recognition of the lesion by repair enzymes. In most organisms (excluding placental mammals such as humans) they can be repaired by photoreactivation. Photoreactivation is a repair process in which photolyase enzymes directly reverse CPDs via photochemical reactions. Lesions on the DNA strand are recognized by these enzymes, followed by the absorption of light wavelengths >300 nm (i.e. fluorescent and sunlight). This absorption enables the photochemical reactions to occur, which results in the elimination of the pyrimidine dimer, returning it to its original state.

The UV dose that reduces a population of wild-type yeast cells to 37% survival is equivalent (assuming a Poisson distribution of hits) to the UV dose that causes an average of one lethal hit to each of the cells of the population.  The number of pyrimidine dimers induced per haploid genome at this dose was measured as 27,000.  A mutant yeast strain defective in the three pathways by which pyrimidine dimers were known to be repaired in yeast was also tested for UV sensitivity.  It was found in this case that only one or, at most, two unrepaired pyrimidine dimers per haploid genome are lethal to the cell.  These findings thus indicate that the repair of thymine dimers in wild-type yeast is highly efficient.

Nucleotide excision repair, sometimes termed "dark reactivation", is a more general mechanism for repair of lesions. This process excises the CPD and synthesizes new DNA to replace the surrounding region in the molecule. Xeroderma pigmentosum is a genetic disease in humans in which the nucleotide excision repair process is lacking, resulting in skin discolouration and multiple tumours on exposure to UV light. Unrepaired pyrimidine dimers in humans may lead to melanoma.

A few organisms have other ways to perform repairs:
 Spore photoproduct lyase is found in spore-forming bacteria. It returns thymine dimers to their original state.
 Deoxyribodipyrimidine endonucleosidase is found in bacteriophage T4. It is a base excision repair enzyme specific for pyrimidine dimers. It is then able to cut open the AP site.

Sunscreen and melanoma
A study by Hanson suggests sunscreen that penetrates into the skin and thereby amplifies the amount of free radicals and oxidative stress
 contributes to the formation of melanoma, but this idea has not been validated by other researchers.

Effect of topical sunscreen and effect of absorbed sunscreen 
Direct DNA damage is reduced by sunscreen. This prevents sunburn. When the sunscreen is at the surface of the skin, it filters the UV rays, which attenuates the intensity. Even when the sunscreen molecules have penetrated into the skin, they protect against direct DNA damage, because the UV light is absorbed by the sunscreen and not by the DNA.

See also 
DNA repair

References

DNA
Mutation
Dimers (chemistry)
DNA replication and repair-deficiency disorders
Senescence
Cyclobutanes